Events from the year 1726 in Great Britain.

Incumbents
 Monarch – George I
 Prime Minister – Robert Walpole (Whig)
 Parliament – 6th

Events
 May – Voltaire begins an exile in England which lasts three years.
 25 May – Britain's first circulating library is opened in Edinburgh by poet and bookseller Allan Ramsay.
 27 June – the Grand Allies, a cartel of coalowning families in the Northumberland and Durham Coalfield, is formed by George and Henry Liddell, George Bowes and Sidney and Edward Wortley.
 20 October – dedication of St Martin-in-the-Fields church in London as designed by James Gibbs.
 October–December – Mary Toft from Godalming causes a sensation by purporting to give birth to rabbits.

Undated
 Invention of the gridiron pendulum by John Harrison.
 General George Wade begins an 11-year program of road improvement and bridge building in Scotland.

Publications
 Jonathan Swift's anonymous novel Gulliver's Travels.

Births
 17 January – Hugh Mercer, soldier and physician (died 1777)
 8 March – Richard Howe, admiral (died 1799)
 12 April – Charles Burney, music historian (died 1814)
 12 May – Alexander Hood, naval officer (died 1814)
 3 June – James Hutton, geologist (died 1797)
 14 June – Thomas Pennant, naturalist (died 1798)
 2 September – John Howard, prison reformer (died 1790)
 26 September – John H. D. Anderson, scientist (died 1796)

Deaths
 5 March – Evelyn Pierrepont, 1st Duke of Kingston-upon-Hull, politician (born c. 1655)
 26 March – John Vanbrugh, architect and dramatist (born 1664)
 26 April – Jeremy Collier, theatre critic, non-juror bishop and theologian (born 1650)
 28 April – Thomas Pitt, Governor of Madras (born 1653)
 10 May – Charles Beauclerk, 1st Duke of St Albans, soldier (born 1670)
 8 July – John Ker, Scottish Presbyterian and informer (born 1673 in Scotland)
 August – Colonel John Stewart, Member of Parliament for the Kirkcudbright Stewartry, killed by Sir Gilbert Eliott, 3rd Baronet, of Stobs
 5 November – Lady Mary Tudor, heiress (born 1673)
 23 November – Sophia, Princess of Zelle, queen consort of George I of Great Britain (born 1666)

References

 
Years in Great Britain